Holy Child Church is a historic church off I-40 in Tijeras, New Mexico.

It was built in 1912 and added to the National Register of Historic Places in 1978.

References

Roman Catholic churches in New Mexico
Churches on the National Register of Historic Places in New Mexico
Roman Catholic churches completed in 1912
Churches in Bernalillo County, New Mexico
1912 establishments in New Mexico
National Register of Historic Places in Bernalillo County, New Mexico
20th-century Roman Catholic church buildings in the United States
New Mexico State Register of Cultural Properties